Dmytro Anatoliiovych "Dmitri" Khristich (born July 23, 1969) is a Ukrainian former professional ice hockey player. 

Khristich played 811 games in the NHL in his career, for the Washington Capitals, Los Angeles Kings, Boston Bruins, and Toronto Maple Leafs. He was most recently the Head coach of EIHL side the Edinburgh Capitals, joining in June 2017 but departing in December of the same year. In Feb 2022, it's been reported that Dmitri took up arms to defend Ukraine.

Achievements 
Khristich appeared in the 1997 and 1999 NHL All-Star Games. In the 1998–99 season, he had the highest shooting percentage (20.1%) among players with at least 82 shots (an average of at least one shot per scheduled game). He is the all-time scoring leader for players born and trained in Ukraine.

Transactions 
 July 8, 1995 – Traded to the Los Angeles Kings with Byron Dafoe for the Kings' 1st round choice (Alexandre Volchkov) and the Dallas Stars' 4th round choice (previously acquired, Washington selected Justin Davis) in the 1996 NHL Entry Draft.
 August 29, 1997 – Traded to the Boston Bruins with Byron Dafoe for Jozef Stümpel, Sandy Moger, and the Bruins' 4th round choice (later traded to the New Jersey Devils, who selected Pierre Dagenais) in the 1998 NHL Entry Draft.
 October 20, 1999 – Traded to the Toronto Maple Leafs for the Maple Leafs' 2nd round choice (Ivan Huml) in the 2000 NHL Entry Draft.
 December 11, 2000 – Traded back to the Washington Capitals for the Tampa Bay Lightning's 3rd round choice (previously acquired, the Maple Leafs selected Brendan Bell) in the 2001 NHL Entry Draft.

International play 
Khristich represented the Soviet Union in the 1990 World Ice Hockey Championships where he won a gold medal. He played for Ukraine at the 2001, 2002 and 2003 World Championships. He also represented Ukraine at the 2002 Winter Olympics. He played two games and scored two goals. The team finished in 10th place.

Awards
Selected to two NHL All-Star Games: 1997, 1999

Career statistics

Regular season and playoffs

International

References

External links

1969 births
Living people
American ice hockey coaches
Baltimore Skipjacks players
Boston Bruins players
Expatriate ice hockey players in Russia
Ice hockey players at the 2002 Winter Olympics
Metallurg Magnitogorsk players
Los Angeles Kings players
National Hockey League All-Stars
Olympic ice hockey players of Ukraine
Sokil Kyiv players
Soviet expatriate ice hockey players
Soviet expatriate sportspeople in the United States
Soviet ice hockey right wingers
Sportspeople from Kyiv
Toronto Maple Leafs players
Washington Capitals draft picks
Washington Capitals players
Ukrainian emigrants to the United States
Ukrainian expatriate sportspeople in Canada
Ukrainian expatriate sportspeople in the United States
Ukrainian ice hockey coaches
Ukrainian ice hockey right wingers
American expatriate ice hockey players in Russia
Ukrainian expatriate sportspeople in Russia